Dorina Zele (born February 13, 1992) is a Hungarian basketball player for PEAC-Pécs and the Hungarian national team.

She participated at the EuroBasket Women 2017.

References

1992 births
Living people
Hungarian women's basketball players
People from Szolnok
Shooting guards
Sportspeople from Jász-Nagykun-Szolnok County